Don Joseph Pear is an Italian fairy tale collected by Thomas Frederick Crane in his Italian Popular Tales.

It is Aarne-Thompson type 545B.

Synopsis

Three brothers owned a pear tree and lived on the pears.  One day, all the pears were stolen, and the brothers decided to watch it during the night.  The older two fell asleep on their turns, but the youngest, Don Joseph, stayed awake, and when a fox came to steal, threatened to shoot him.  The fox promised that if he let him go, he would marry the king's daughter.  He did not believe it, but let the fox go.

Twice, the fox hunted all manner of game and presented it to the king, as a gift from Don Joseph Pear.  He then went to an ogress and convinced her it was time to divide the gold and silver.  He went to the king to get a measure for Don Joseph Pear to divide the gold and silver, which convinced the king that Don Joseph was rich.

The fox then dressed Don Joseph well and set him off to travel with the king and his daughter.  He the fox went ahead and when peasants threw rocks at him, threatened to have them killed if they did not describe the land and flocks as Don Joseph's.  Then he got to the ogress's castle, told her the horsemen were coming to kill them, and suggested they hide in the well.  He threw her in, killing her.

One day, Don Joseph threw dust into the fox's eyes, and the fox threatened to tell what he knew.  So Don Joseph threw a jar and killed the fox, but he still lived happily ever after.

See also

How the Beggar Boy turned into Count Piro
The Golden Bird
Puss in Boots
Lord Peter

External links
SurLaLune Fairy Tale site Don Joseph Pear

Italian fairy tales
ATU 500-559
Thomas Frederick Crane